Massa is a surname. Notable people with the surname include:

 Baebius Massa (c. 40-45 – after 93 AD), Roman governor
 Chancel Massa (born 1985), Congolese footballer
 Davide Massa (born 1981), Italian football referee
 Edgardo Massa (born 1981), former tennis player from Argentina
 Elsa Massa (1923–2018), Argentine human rights activist
 Eric Massa (born 1959), former U.S. Congressman for the 29th Congressional District of New York
 Felipe Massa (born 1981), Brazilian Formula One racing driver
 Frank Massa (1906–1990), American engineer
 Geofrey Massa (born 1986), Ugandan footballer
 Giuseppe Massa (1948–2017), Italian footballer
 Gordon Massa (1935–2016), American baseball player
 Isaac Massa (1586–1643), Dutch merchant, traveler and diplomat
 Ivan Massa (born 1990), Ugandan airline pilot
 James Massa (born 1960), Auxiliary Bishop of Brooklyn, and the Titular Bishop of Bardstown
 Leo Massa (1929–2009), American cross-country skier
 Leonardo Massa (born 1967), Italian rower
 Lorenzo Massa (1882–1949), Argentine Catholic priest
 Mario Massa (1892–1956), Italian freestyle swimmer who competed in the 1908 Summer Olympics
 Mark Massa (born 1961), is a Justice of the Indiana Supreme Court
 Mark S. Massa, Professor of Theology at Fordham University in New York
 Marlinde Massa (1944–2014), German field hockey player
 Martí Vergés Massa (1934–2021), Spanish footballer
 Michelangelo Pisani di Massa e di Mormile (born 1933), Italian diplomat
 Mirta Massa (born 1945), first delegate of Argentina to capture the Miss International crown in 1967
 Niccolò Massa (1485–1569), Italian anatomist who wrote an early anatomy text
 Sebastián Massa (born 1975), Argentine former rower
 Sergio Massa (born 1972), Argentine Justicialist Party politician, Chief of Cabinet of Ministers from 2007-2008